The Slovenian Third Football League ( or commonly 3. SNL) is the third tier of the Slovenian football system. Since 2019 the league consists of two regional groups (East and West). They are operated by the Intercommunal Football Associations.

Format and rules
Between 1992–93 and 1997–98, the Slovenian Third League was divided into two regional groups (East and West), with both group winners directly promoting to the Slovenian Second League (except in the 1994–95 season, when the top two divisions got reorganized).

In the 1998–99 season, the league was expanded to four regional groups (Centre, East, North, West). Up to the 2002–03 season, all four group winners were promoted directly to the second division. In the 2003–04 season, a two-legged play-offs were introduced, as only two teams promoted.

In the 2004–05 season, the format was changed back to two regional groups with both group winners promoting.

From the 2014–15 season onwards, the league was again divided into four regional groups. Three of those groups (Centre, East and North) were composed of fourteen clubs, while the West group consisted of ten clubs.

In the 2014–15 and 2015–16 seasons, the group winners played a promotional two-legged play-off to decide two promoting teams. Due to expansion of the Slovenian Second League, the top two teams in each of the four groups were promoted in the 2016–17 season. In the following season, the group winners again played a two-legged play-off for two promotion spots.

In the 2018–19 season, the North, Centre and East groups were reduced to ten teams. After the season, the old system with two groups (East and West) with both winners promoting to the Second League was reintroduced.

2022–23 teams

East
Brežice 1919
Cirkulane
Dobrovce
Drava Ptuj
Dravinja
Dravograd
Ljutomer
Podvinci
Posavje Krško
Rače
Šampion
Šmartno 1928
Videm pri Ptuju
Zavrč

West
Adria
Brda
Dren Vrhnika
Izola
Lesce
Sava Kranj
Šenčur
Škofja Loka
Slovan
Svoboda Ljubljana
Tolmin
Vipava
Visoko
Žiri

Winners

Notes

References

External links
Football Association of Slovenia 
Soccerway profile

 
3
Sports leagues established in 1992
1992 establishments in Slovenia
Third level football leagues in Europe